Julian Gamble (born September 15, 1989) is an American professional basketball player for Bnei Herzliya in the Israeli Basketball Premier League. He plays the center position.

Professional career
After five years with the Miami Hurricanes, in 2013 Gamble signed with the Saint-Vallier Basket Drôme, in France. In 2014, he became a new player of the Phoenix Brussels, where he remained until 2016. That year, he signed with Telekom Baskets Bonn of the German Basketball Bundesliga.

In May 2018, Gamble left Telekom Baskets Bonn and joined ASVEL Basket of the French LNB Pro A. However, at the end of the season, he signed with Nanterre 92 of the LNB Pro A and in the Basketball Champions League (BCL).

Virtus Bologna (2019–2021) 
On July 22, 2019, he has signed with Virtus Bologna of the Italian Lega Basket Serie A (LBA). On 7 April 2020, after more than a month of suspension, the Italian Basketball Federation officially ended the 2019–20 season, due to the coronavirus pandemic that severely hit Italy. Virtus ended the season first, with 18 wins and only 2 defeats, but the title was not assigned. On 5 May, the EuroCup season ended too.

In April 2021, despite a winning record of 19–2, Virtus was defeated in the EuroCup's semifinals by UNICS Kazan. However, the season ended with a great success. In fact, after having knocked out 3–0 both Basket Treviso in the quarterfinals and New Basket Brindisi in the semifinals, on 11 June Virtus defeated 4–0 its historic rival Olimpia Milan in the national finals, winning its 16th national title and the first one after twenty years.

Lenovo Tenerife (2021) 
On September 28, 2021, Gamble signed with Lenovo Tenerife of the Spanish Liga ACB, called to replace the injured Giorgi Shermadini. He  averaged 10.2 points and 4.6 rebounds per game. Gamble parted ways with the team on November 7.

San Pablo Burgos (2021–2022) 
On November 10, 2021, he has signed with San Pablo Burgos of the Spanish Liga ACB.

Lenovo Tenerife (2022–present) 
On October 10, 2022, he has signed with Bnei Herzliya of the Israeli Basketball Premier League.

The Basketball Tournament (2014, 2017–present) 
In the summers of 2014 and 2017, Gamble played in The Basketball Tournament on ESPN for team Armored Athlete.  He competed for the $2 million prize, and for team Armored Athlete in 2017, he averaged 15.3 points per game along with 7.8 rebounds per game.

Gamble helped take team Armored Athlete in 2017 to the West Regional Championship Game, where they lost to Team Challenge ALS 75–63. In TBT 2018, Gamble averaged 10 points, 10 rebounds, and 2.3 blocks per game for Armored Athlete. They reached the Super 16 before falling to Boeheim's Army.

References

1989 births
Living people
American expatriate basketball people in Belgium
American expatriate basketball people in France
American expatriate basketball people in Germany
American expatriate basketball people in Italy
American expatriate basketball people in Spain
American men's basketball players
ASVEL Basket players
Basketball players from North Carolina
Bnei Hertzeliya basketball players
Brussels Basketball players
CB Canarias players
Centers (basketball)
Lega Basket Serie A players
Miami Hurricanes men's basketball players
Nanterre 92 players
Saint-Vallier Basket Drôme players
Sportspeople from Durham, North Carolina
Telekom Baskets Bonn players
Virtus Bologna players